Crow Park railway station served the village of Sutton-on-Trent, Nottinghamshire, England from 1882 to 1964 on the East Coast Main Line.

History 
The station opened on 1 November 1882 by the Great Northern Railway. It closed to passengers on 6 October 1958 and closed to goods traffic in 1964.

References

External links 

Disused railway stations in Nottinghamshire
Former Great Northern Railway stations
Railway stations in Great Britain opened in 1850
Railway stations in Great Britain closed in 1958
1850 establishments in England
1964 disestablishments in England
Sutton-on-Trent